Thompsonia may refer to either of these taxa:-
Thompsonia (plant), in the plant family Passifloraceae
Thompsonia (crustacean), a parasitic barnacle